The Mangal are a tribe of the Pashtun people residing in eastern Paktia and adjacent Khost provinces of Afghanistan, and in the town of Tari Mangal, district Kurram, Pakistan. Their land constitutes the northeastern part of the Loya Paktia (Greater Paktia) region. The Mangals descend from Karlani Pashtun lineage.

Mangals are known for their brave and independent nature, they have resisted the various militant groups in the region and other external infiltrators, nevertheless they have remained neutral in respect of recent conflicts. The majority of Mangals are spread across Afghanistan who among other Afghans have been attached to professions such as politicians, military commanders, teachers and scholars specializing in Pashto literature. The Mangal leaders are most recognized for settling tribal disputes and have established an unwritten code known as nerkh, which the Pashtun tribes still use as a tool to resolve conflict among each other. A small number of Mangals residing in the present day lakki marwat District around 1500 AD along with the Honi tribe. Most of these Mangals live as independent in lakki marwat (kpk) and in Kurma Pakistan which borders the Mangal province of Paktia in Afghanistan. 

Mangal tribe is also found in Pakistan's Khyber-Pakhtunkhwa province mainly in area of Thall Valley and also in District Hangu and Orakzai Agency of FATA.
A  large group of Mangal's are living in the valley of kurram agency's areas such as Tari Mangal, Kutri Mangal, Gobazana, Haqdara, Gidu, Sursurang, Piwar tangi and Shalawzan Tangi.
Mangal tribe also found in Qematay Mangal nearer to Tari Mangal on Afghanistan side. Mangals Of Tari Mangal and Mangals of Qematay Mangal are relatives of each other. These Mangals on both sides of the border between Pakistan and Afghanistan are called the saver of the border. Tari Mangal, Qematay, Kutri, Gidu and Shalawzan are popular for tourism as thousands of people from different parts of Pakistan have been visiting these zones on special occasions.
Almost 70% to 75% Mangal are live in Afghanistan side and 20% to 25% live in Pakistan side .

Educationalist and Political activist Syed Ahmad Shah also belongs to Tari Mangal, Parachinar Kurram Agency.He is serving as a Principal in International Public School Teri Mangal since 2001. Mangals are living bothsides in Afghanistan and Pakistan.

History 
In 1924 to 1925, the Mangal fought in the Khost rebellion (1924–1925).

The Mangal tribal militia was one of the various militias assisted Mohammed Nadir Shah to topple the Tajik King, Habibullah Kalakani. Consequently, Nadir Khan owed much to the tribes of Paktia, these tribal leaders were granted vast war booty and power by the new administration. In fact, the entire greater Loya Paktia region was exempt from mandatory military service, which the rest of the nation (regardless of ethnicity, region, or family) endured. 

The Mangal tribal militia was deployed in Northern Afghanistan shortly before Nadir Khan's assassination to oust an Uzbek Muslim resistance fighter, Ibrahimbeg Laqqai, who was using ethnic kin support in Northern Afghanistan against Soviets in his homeland across the Oxus river. Laqqai had been successfully battling Soviet troops, who had taken over his homeland of modern-day Uzbekistan, in what is now known as the Basmachi Movement. During Kalakani's short rule as king, Laqqai was given support in the Northern Tajik and Uzbek communities and thus he recruited locals to fight across the river against the Soviets. Mohammad Nader Khan worried by this, summoned the Mangal tribe, amongst others, armed them with Soviet-supplied weaponry and motivated them by promises of war booty, to being dispatched to the north. Within a few months, with Soviet support and systematic terror against Tajik and Uzbek locals, the Basmachi Movement were brutally crushed in Afghanistan and eventually in Central Asia and driven him back across the Amu river, where Ibrahimbeg Laqqai was subsequently captured and hanged by the Soviets. 

The Mangals also played a notable role in the late 20th century history of Afghanistan. The son and grandsons of the Mangals who toppled Habibullah Kalakani were recruited in the Afghan Army and educated in Soviet Military Academies. Consequently, they came back as ideological Communists who eventually joined military corp of the KHALQ faction and overthrew the Monarchy

Mangal Sub-tribes 
Just like other Pashtun tribes, The Mangal tribe also have their own individual sub tribes and clans which have their own areas within the Mangal terroritry 
 

Musa Khil

1: Hasan khil

2: Khujuri

3: Haibi 

4: Margai

5: Kamal Khil

6: Meral Khil

Jani Khil

1: Kamazi 

2: Darman Khil

3: sulimen khil

4: Lama Khil

See also
Tari Mangal
Loya Paktia

Sources
Henry Walter Bellew. An inquiry into the ethnography of Afghanistan

References

External links
Mangal/Mongol Tribal Tree, Center for Culture and Conflict Studies, US Naval Postgraduate School.

Karlani Pashtun tribes
Ethnic groups in Khost Province